Tiësto's Club Life is Dutch DJ Tiësto's weekly radio show that was formerly broadcast on Radio 538 in the Netherlands. It was broadcast on 3FM, but in 2015, Tiësto came back to Radio 538. The show started broadcasting on 6 April 2007 every Friday evening, from 10 PM CET to midnight. The show is also frequently broadcast on the Sirius and XM satellite radio channel Electric AREA. The show was originally called Club Nouveau for the first five episodes before being renamed Club Life.

The show is split into two parts. The first hour features a mix of current hits, and in the second hour Tiësto presents a variety of electronic genres, including minimal, house and trance. The show also features exclusive releases from Tiësto's own label, Black Hole Recordings. The free podcast is released the following Monday on iTunes as well as on Xbox Music without the 15 Minutes of Fame.

1worldspace and Sirius Satellite Radio/XM Satellite Radio in the United States later started broadcasting the show. It is broadcast on Electric Area (Channel 52 on Sirius and XM) as part of their Global Domination lineup on Saturday nights. The show is broadcast on Radio 538 on Friday nights between 22:00 CET and midnight and on Electric Area on Saturday nights between 10:00 p.m. ET and 12:00 a.m. ET. The first hour is also available as a podcast on the Radio 538 website and on iTunes audio podcasts.

In 2012, Tiësto launched Tiësto's Club Life Radio, a 24/7 commercial-free music channel. The channel features a variety of electronic dance music including progressive house, electro, trance and downtempo, all selected by Tiësto. Other DJs also appear on the channel. Tiësto's Club Life Radio was available in the Dance/Electronic category through the SiriusXM App for smartphones and mobile devices, and on channel 340 on Edge satellite radios and on SiriusXM Internet Radio. The channel left the air and the SiriusXM lineup on 24 June 2017. The Club Life program continued to air on Electric Area before it rebranded as Diplo's Revolution.

Each week, Tiësto's Club Life Radio airs a countdown of Tiësto's current favorite songs during the weekly special "Tiësto’s Top Ten" as well as new and classic editions of Tiësto's Club Life radio show, which currently airs on SiriusXM's BPM, channel 51, every Friday at 9:00 pm PT. Club Life is also heard on more than 350 other stations worldwide in 77 countries.

Regular features

Club Life (old format) 
 Tiësto's Classic: Tiësto selects a track that he feels is notable within the world of Trance.
 15 Minutes of Fame: Included in the second hour, Tiësto gives an upcoming DJ the opportunity to have their '15 minutes of fame'.

Club Life (new format) 
Implemented in May 2015:

 Club Life Exclusive: New upcoming tracks played for the first time in Club Life.
 Club Life Request: Tiësto selects a track requested by the fans using the hashtag #ClublifeRequest on Twitter.
 Hot From the Studio: Tiësto select a track that he feels is awesome.
 Mash-up of the Week: Mash-up track taken from the different musical platforms or the mailbox.
 Tiësto's Classic: Tiësto selects a classic track that he feels is notable within the world of electronic dance music.
 Guest Mix: Mixes created by other DJs in the last 15 minutes of the first hour of Club Life.
 Takeover: Deep & Tech House mixes from another DJ's during 30 min or all the time in the second hour of Club Life.

Changed in July 2019:

 2nd Hour: Removed; now the show is one hour only.
 Tiësto's Classic: Removed.
 Guest Mix: Intermittently included rather than being a regular fixture.

Move to 3FM and back
In April 2011, the show moved from Radio 538 to 3FM. On 1 May 2015, the show returned to Radio 538.

Special episodes

2022
Episode 822: Most Supported Tracks Of 2022
Episode 821: Musical Freedom Yearmix
Episode 820: Best of AFTR:HRS 2022
Episode 819: Best of Tiësto 2022
Episode 812: Special for Amsterdam Dance Event 2022
Episode 811: Afterhours Special
Episode 800: Tiësto Recprded Life @ Tomorrowland Weekend 2, Belgium 2022-07-23
Episode 799: Top 20 Summer Hits
Episode 780: Afterhours Special
Episode 771: Most Supported Tracks Of 2021
Episode 770: Best of Tiësto 2021

2021
 Episode 769: Musical Freedom Yearmix 2021
 Episode 768: Tiësto Recorded Live @ EDC Las Vegas, United States 2021-10-23
 Episode 767: AFTR:HRS Hosted by VER:WEST
 Episode 750: Top 50 Tracks selected by the Tiësto fans
 Episode 746: VER:WEST live from Factory 93
 Episode 719: Mixed by VER:WEST
 Episode 718: Best of Musical Freedom 2020 Part 2

2020
 Episode 717: Best of Tiësto 2020
 Episode 716: Most Supported Tracks of 2020
 Episode 700: DJs & Friends selected their favorite song played in CLUBLIFE ever
 Episode 696: Tomorrowland Around The World 2020: VER:WEST (DJ Mix)
 Episode 693: AFTR:HRS Special
 Episode 692: Stadium Anthems
 Episode 685: The London Sessions Special
 Episode 683: AFTR:HRS Special
 Episode 679: AFTR:HRS Special

2019
 Episode 665: Most Supported Tracks of 2019
 Episode 664: mint 'Best Dance of the 2010s'
 Episode 663: Best of AFTR:HRS 2019
 Episode 655: Musical Freedom 10th Years Anniversary Special
 Episode 654: Tiësto Tracks & Remixes 2019 Special
 Episode 653: Summer Hits 2019 Special
 Episode 652: Tiësto @ Stellar Stage, Moonrise Festival, United States 2019-08-11
 Episode 650: Tiësto @ Mainstage, Tomorrowland, Belgium 2019-07-19
 Episode 640: Special Episode

2018
 Episode 613: Best Songs of 2018
 Episode 612: Best Remixes 2018
 Episode 611: Best Afterhours 2018
 Episode 610: Best of MF and AFTR:HRS 2018
 Episode 600: Top 60 CLUBLIFE tracks of all time (Selected by the Fans)
 Episode 594: Tiësto @ Mainstage, Untold Festival, Romania 2018-08-03
 Episode 592: Tiësto @ Mainstage, Tomorrowland, Belgium 2018-07-27
 Episode 578: Tribute To Avicii

2017
 Episode 561: The Best Songs of 2017
 Episode 560: AFTR:HRS Special
 Episode 559: Musical Freedom Yearmix
 Episode 550: CLUBLIFE vol. 5
 Episode 519: Musical Freedom 200th Releases

2016
 Episode 509: The Best Songs of 2016
 Episode 508: AFTR:HRS Special
 Episode 500: Tiësto @ Live From ZiggoDome, Amsterdam, The Netherlands (21-10-2016)

2015
 Episode 456: The Best Songs of 2015
 Episode 441: Tiesto & Stadiumx
 Episode 440: Tiësto & Justin Prime
 Episode 439: Tiësto & Sick Individuals
 Episode 438: Tiësto & Cazzette
 Episode 437: Tiësto & Ummet Ozcan 
 Episode 436: Tiësto & VICE & Ferreck Dawn
 Episode 435: Tiësto & The Chainsmokers
 Episode 434: Tiësto & Robin Schulz
 Episode 433: Tiësto & Laidback Luke & Mike Mago
 Episode 432: Tiësto & Nervo
 Episode 431: Tiësto & Vicentone 
 Episode 430: Tiësto & BURNS
 Episode 429: Tiësto & Dannic & Eelke Kleijn
 Episode 428: Tiësto & Don Diablo
 Episode 427: Tiësto & Afrojack 
 Episode 426: Tiësto & Dimitri Vangelis & Wyman
 Episode 425: Tiësto & Hook N Sling & Bakermat 
 Episode 424: Tiësto & R3hab
 Episode 423: Tiësto & W&W
 Episode 422: Tiësto & Avicii & Oliver Heldens
 Episode 421: Tiësto & ZAXX
 Episode 420: Tiësto & Tigerlily
 Episode 419: Tiësto & Moti 
 Episode 418: Tiësto & Dzeko & Torres
 Episode 416: Tiësto & Disco Fries
 Episode 412: Tiësto & Luca Guerrieri
 Episode 410: Tiësto & Dirty Vegas
 Episode 405: Special A Town Called Paradise and Tiësto Remixes of The Year 2015

2014
 Episode 404: After Hours Special
 Episode 401: Tiësto & HELENA
 Episode 400: 400th Episode Special (4 Hour Show)
 Episode 396: Tiësto & Seven Lions
 Episode 394: Deephouse Special
 Episode 391: 90's Special Mix
 Episode 389: Tiësto & Tigerlily
 Episode 388: Afterhours Special 
 Episode 384: Tiësto & Oliver Heldens 
 Episode 383: Tiësto & Francesco Rossi
 Episode 365: Tiësto & The Chainsmokers
 Episode 360: Tiësto & Flosstradamus
 Episode 358: Best of 2000-2010
 Episode 357: After Hours Special
 Episode 354: Jeremy Olander Guestmix (Hour 2)

2013
 Episode 352: Best Tracks of 2013
 Episode 351: Musical Freedom Special
 Episode 350: Tiësto & Eelke Kleijn
 Episode 345: twoloud Guest Mix
 Episode 344: After Hours Special
 Episode 341: Moti Guest Mix
 Episode 339: Stefan Biniak Guest Mix
 Episode 338: Club Life 90's Special 
 Episode 337: Delayers Guest Mix
 Episode 333: Nari & Milani Guest Mix
 Episode 331: Club Life After Hours Special
 Episode 326: Bass King Vs. X-Vertigo Guestmix (Hour 2)
 Episode 325: Special Tribute Club Life Vol. 1,2,3 
 Episode 317: Alvaro Guestmix (Hour 2)
 Episode 314: Dimitri Vegas & Like Mike Guestmix (Hour 2)
 Episode 310: Special Dyro
 Episode 305: HMH Special 
 Episode 304: Sandro Silva Live Guestmix (Hour 2)
 Episode 303: Jordy Dazz Live Heineken (Hour 2)
 Episode 302: Dannic Guestmix (Hour 2)
 Episode 301: Firebeatz Live Guestmix (Hour 2)

2012
 Episode 300: Favourite Tracks of the year. (last episode of 2012)
 Episode 291: Halloween Special
 Episode 287: Ibiza 2012 Special
 Episode 275: Presented by Hardwell 
 Episode 261: Miami Special
 Episode 257: Swedish Invasion Special. (Tiësto focuses on the music, people, DJs and producers of Sweden)
 Episode 253: Las Vegas Special

2011
 Episode 247: Favourite 10 Tracks of the year. (last episode of 2011)
 Episode 240: The end of the College Invasion Tour. (some of the fans talking about the gigs throughout the episode)
 Episodes 212,213 and 214: Announcing Club Life: Volume One Las Vegas. (at the beginning)
 Episode 200 Tiësto Club Life.

2010
 Episode 195: Special Club Life Best 24 Track's of 2010
 Episode 144: Fan's Favorite Tracks of 2009
 Episode 145: DJ Scott William's Best tracks of 2009

2009
 Episode 129: 2 Hour Creamfields Daresbury UK 04-09-2009
 Episode 121: 1 Hour Ibiza Residency
 Episode 119: Tiësto feat. Sneaky Sound System – I Will Be Here (World premiere)
 Episode 111: 1 Hour Queensday Museumplein Amsterdam NL 30-04-2009
 Episode 100: Your Favourite Tracks 100th episode Club Life

2008
 Episode 091: Best of 2008
 Episode 084: Black Hole Recordings Special
 Episode 083: 1 Hour Privilege Ibiza closing party special Part 2
 Episode 082: 1 Hour Privilege Ibiza closing party special
 Episode 079: 1 Hour Mysteryland Special Part 2
 Episode 078: 1 Hour Mysteryland Special
 Episode 063: In Search of Sunrise Series Special Part 2
 Episode 062: In Search of Sunrise Series Special

2007
 Episode 039: End of the Year Mix
 Episode 023: In Search of Sunrise Series Special
 Episode 017: First hour from Live @ Expo Center – Kiev, Ukraine 23-06-2007
 Episode 013: First hour from Live @ The Point – Dublin, Ireland 16-06-2007
 Episode 008: First hour from Tiësto Live @ King's Hall Belfast 31-03-2007
 Episode 004: First hour from Tiësto Live @ EOL Alexandra Palace London, UK 20-04-2007

Awards
 2009 IDMA Awards Miami: Best Podcast
 2010 IDMA Awards Miami: Best Radio Show

References

External links
 Tiësto's Club Life Tracklist
 Tiësto's Club Life
 Radio 3FM / BNN 
 Tiësto's Club Life RSS Feed

Tiësto
Dutch music radio programs
Electronic music radio shows
Trance music
2007 radio programme debuts